Neonatal toxic shock-like exanthematous disease is a cutaneous condition characterized by a generalized diffuse macular erythema or morbilliform eruption with confluence.

See also 
 Staphylococcal scalded skin syndrome
 List of cutaneous conditions

References 

Bacterium-related cutaneous conditions